Florin Gardoș (born 29 October 1988) is a Romanian former professional footballer who played as a central defender.

Early life
Gardoș was born in the city of Satu Mare in Romania.

Club career

Gardoș started his senior career with Concordia Chiajna in 2006. In his first season at the club, he helped them achieve promotion to the second division.

Steaua București
On 17 June 2010, Gardoș was transferred to FC Steaua București. He made his competitive debut for the Roș-albaștrii on 16 August, in a Liga I match against Victoria Brănești.

In September 2011, Gardoș received a ten-match ban after seriously tackling Pandurii Târgu Jiu midfielder Cosmin Băcilă, which resulted in a broken left tibia and fibula.

Southampton
On 14 August 2014, Gardoș signed a four-year deal with English club Southampton for an undisclosed fee, believed to be around €7.5 million. On 13 September, he made his first appearance for "the Saints" as an 89th-minute substitute for Jack Cork in a 4–0 Premier League victory over Newcastle United. His first start came on 23 September in a 2–1 away defeat of Arsenal in the League Cup.

On 23 July 2015, Southampton manager Ronald Koeman announced that Gardoș would be sidelined for up to seven months after suffering a knee injury in a pre-season friendly with Feyenoord. He finally made his return to the first team in a 5–0 FA Cup loss to Arsenal on 28 January 2017.

Universitatea Craiova
On 19 February 2018, the last day of the winter transfer window in Romania, Gardoș joined Universitatea Craiova on loan for the remainder of the campaign. He made his debut on 31 March in a league fixture against CFR Cluj, which finished 0–0. Gardoș played a further three matches in all competitions before suffering a strain on 28 April which effectively ended his season.

As his contract with Southampton was not renewed, he chose to stay in Oltenia, and signed a two-year contract with Universitatea Craiova.

Notes

International career
Gardoș made his senior debut for Romania in a friendly game against Ukraine, on 8 February 2011.

Career statistics

Club

International

Honours

Club
Concordia Chiajna
 Liga III: 2006–07

Steaua București
 Liga I: 2012–13, 2013–14
 Cupa României: 2011
 Supercupa României: 2013

Southampton
 EFL Cup runner-up: 2016–17

Universitatea Craiova
 Cupa României: 2017–18
 Supercupa României runner-up: 2018

References

External links

1988 births
Living people
Sportspeople from Satu Mare
Romanian sportspeople of Hungarian descent
Romanian footballers
Association football defenders
Liga I players
Liga II players
FC Olimpia Satu Mare players
CS Concordia Chiajna players
FC Steaua București players
Premier League players
Southampton F.C. players
CS Universitatea Craiova players
FC Politehnica Iași (2010) players
LPS HD Clinceni players
Romania youth international footballers
Romania under-21 international footballers
Romania international footballers
Romanian expatriate footballers
Expatriate footballers in England
Romanian expatriate sportspeople in England